As One (stylized as AS ONE), also known as AS1 in South Korea to avoid confusion with Korean girlband As One, was a Hong Kong Cantopop girl group formed by Sun Entertainment Culture and choreographer Sunny Wong.

The meaning behind the group's name is based on the concept of unity, with the members united together "as one". The group was consisted of four members; Shin, Oli, Elfa and Nata. The group promoted as a quartet for two years until Oli's departure in August 2014 to pursue her studies. Subsequently, two new members (Chloe and Kayan) joined the group in March 2015 after emerging as champions of a scouting audition. Elfa announced her temporary hiatus from the group in May 2015 due to sustained injuries. As of 15 May 2015, As One is promoting as a quartet with Shin, Nata, Chloe and Kayan.

They were trained in Korea in 2015 and made a comeback in both South Korea and Hong Kong. On the other hand, Shin participated in South Korea Mnet's survival show Produce 101 in 2016. During Shin's absence, this team is working with the remaining 3 members. The band has now disbanded.

Members

Timeline

Discography
Extended Plays
 2013: AsOnE

Cantonese Singles
 2012: "Catch Me Up"
 2013: "Red Hot Hits 2013"
 2013: "4Ever"
 2014: "Be With U"
 2014: "New Girl"
 2015: "Candy Ball"
 2016: "Hey ya"

Korean Singles
 2015: "캔디볼 (Candy Ball)"

Other Songs
 2014: "Let's Goal"

Chart performance

（*）Still charting

Music videos

Books
 2014: "Girls' Anecdotes"

Endorsements

Awards

References

External links
 
 
 

2012 establishments in Hong Kong
Cantopop musical groups
Hong Kong girl groups
Musical groups established in 2012
Musical groups disestablished in 2017
Musical quartets
Hong Kong idols
Korean-language singers of Hong Kong